Events from the year 1647 in Ireland.

Incumbent
Monarch: Charles I

Events
July – James Butler, 1st Duke of Ormonde, surrenders Dublin to parliamentary forces under Michael Jones.
August – Battle of Dungan's Hill, Confederate Ireland army intercepted on a march towards Dublin and destroyed by Parliamentary army.
September – Sack of Cashel: Murrough O'Brien, 1st Earl of Inchiquin, slaughters the Confederate Ireland garrison at Cashel. The priest Theobald Stapleton suffers summary execution. Inchiquin goes on to devastate Catholic-held Munster.
November – Battle of Knocknanuss, Murrough O'Brien, 1st Earl of Inchiquin's Parliamentarian army inflicts crushing defeat on Confederate Ireland's Munster army.

Births
Adam Loftus, 1st Viscount Lisburne, courtier and military commander (d. 1691)

Deaths
13 September – Theobald Stapleton, priest and writer, put to death in Sack of Cashel (b. 1589)
Garret Barry, soldier, served in the Eighty Years' War and the Irish Confederate Wars, military writer.
Col Ciotach, adventurer of Clan Donald, Laird of Colonsay (b. 1570)
Alasdair MacColla, Scottish/Irish soldier, son of Colla Ciotach, killed at the battle of Knocknanuss.

References

 
1640s in Ireland
Ireland
Years of the 17th century in Ireland